"Have You Seen Her" is a song by American soul vocal group the Chi-Lites, released on Brunswick Records in 1971. Composed by the lead singer Eugene Record and Barbara Acklin, the song was included on the group's 1971 album (For God's Sake) Give More Power to the People.

The song begins and ends with a spoken narrator remarking on how he was once happy with a woman; however, she left him, so he passes the days by partaking in leisure activities, where he tries to get relief by telling jokes to the children:

Much to his dismay, the woman does not return or attempt to communicate with him as he had hoped. The narrator ends the song, in a spoken voice, musing on how foolish he was for believing the woman of his dreams would always be around, thinking that he had her in the palm of his hand. Some radio edits have omitted the spoken dialogue. The song peaked at  3 on the Billboard Hot 100, and reached the top of the Billboard R&B Singles chart in November 1971. It also reached No. 3 on the UK Singles Chart in February 1972, and was a UK hit again in 1975 when reissued as a double A-side with "Oh Girl", this time peaking at No. 5.

Charts

Weekly charts

Year-end charts

MC Hammer version

The most significant cover of "Have You Seen Her" was recorded by MC Hammer, for his successful 1990 LP, Please Hammer, Don't Hurt 'Em, which reached No. 4 on the US Billboard Hot 100 and No. 8 on the UK Singles Chart.

Charts

Weekly charts

Year-end charts

Certifications

In culture
 The Barron Knights produced a parody version.
 The song was included in the 2001 list of songs that Clear Channel Communications warned its radio stations that they "might not want to play" after 9/11.

References

External links
 Official website
 [ AllMusic]

1971 singles
1990 singles
The Chi-Lites songs
MC Hammer songs
Songs written by Eugene Record
Songs written by Barbara Acklin
Rhythm and blues ballads
Brunswick Records singles
Capitol Records singles
1971 songs
Torch songs